Middlegate is an unincorporated hamlet along "The Loneliest Road In America," U.S. Route 50, in Churchill County, Nevada, United States. The community consists of a commercial rest stop with food, fuel and lodging accommodations, and some ranches and other private properties in the nearby area. The last recorded population for the hamlet itself was 17 permanent residents.

Middlegate Station
Middlegate Station is a rest stop/commercial area with a gas station, bar and restaurant, motel and RV park.

Stephen King stayed at the Middlegate Station motel for seven days and wrote a portion of Desperation.

Middlegate Station was the location for Black Road, Gregory Hutton's award-winning 2002 short film starring William Nilon.

Transportation
Middlegate is served by intersecting U.S. Route 50 (Austin Highway/"The Loneliest Road In America") and Nevada State Route 361 (Gabbs Valley Road) along with multiple unpaved roads giving access to the surrounding ranches.

A former portion of the Lincoln Highway intersects with Gabbs Valley Road at Middlegate Station.

Shoe Tree

Immediately to the east of Middlegate on the northern side of Route 50 is a notable tree, known locally as the "Shoe Tree," with several dozen pairs of shoes hanging from its branches. The original Shoe Tree was cut down by vandals in 2011. Since that time, a nearby tree has been decorated with shoes.

References

External links

Unincorporated communities in Churchill County, Nevada
Unincorporated communities in Nevada